The International Code of Nomenclature of Prokaryotes (ICNP) formerly the International Code of Nomenclature of Bacteria (ICNB) or Bacteriological Code (BC) governs the scientific names for Bacteria and Archaea. It denotes the rules for naming taxa of bacteria, according to their relative rank. As such it is one of the nomenclature codes of biology.

Originally the International Code of Botanical Nomenclature dealt with bacteria, and this kept references to bacteria until these were eliminated at the 1975 International Botanical Congress. An early Code for the nomenclature of bacteria was approved at the 4th International Congress for Microbiology in 1947, but was later discarded.

The latest version to be printed in book form is the 1990 Revision, but the book does not represent the current rules. The 2008 Revision has been published in the International Journal of Systematic and Evolutionary Microbiology (IJSEM). Rules are maintained by the International Committee on Systematics of Prokaryotes (ICSP; formerly the International Committee on Systematic Bacteriology, ICSB).

The baseline for bacterial names is the Approved Lists with a starting point of 1980. New bacterial names are reviewed by the ICSP as being in conformity with the Rules of Nomenclature and published in the IJSEM.

Cyanobacteria
Since 1975, most bacteria were covered under the bacteriological code. However, cyanobacteria were still covered by the botanical code. Starting in 1999, cyanobacteria were covered by both the botanical and bacteriological codes. This situation has caused nomenclatural problems for the cyanobacteria. By 2020, there were three proposals for how to resolve the situation:
 Exclude cyanobacteria from the bacteriological code.
 Apply the bacteriological code to all cyanobacteria.
 Treat valid publication under the botanical code as valid publication under the bacteriological code.
In 2021, the ICSP held a formal vote on the three proposals and the third option was chosen.

Type strain

Since 2001, when a new bacterial or archaeal species is described, a type strain must be designated. The type strain is a living culture to which the scientific name of that organism is formally attached. For a new species name to be validly published, the type strain must be deposited in a public culture collection in at least two different countries.  Before 2001, a species could also be typified using a description, a preserved specimen, or an illustration. There is a single type strain for each prokaryotic species, but different culture collections may designate a unique name for the same strain. For example, the type strain of E. coli (originally strain U5/41) is called ATCC 11775 by the American Type Culture Collection, DSM 30083 by the German Collection of Microorganisms and Cell Cultures, JCM 1649 by the Japan Collection of Microorganisms, and LMG 2092 by the Belgian Coordinated Collections of Microorganisms. When a prokaryotic species cannot be cultivated in the laboratory (and therefore cannot be deposited in a culture collection), it may be given a provisional candidatus name, but is not considered validly published. Starting in 2022, prokaryotic species and subspecies can also be given a name (considered validly published) under the Code of Nomenclature of Prokaryotes Described from Sequence Data (SeqCode) using high-quality genome sequences as type.

Versions
 Buchanan, R. E., and Ralph St. John-Brooks. (1947, June) (Editors). Proposed Bacteriological Code of Nomenclature. Developed from proposals approved by International Committee on Bacteriological Nomenclature at the Meeting of the Third International Congress for Microbiology. Publication authorized in Plenary Session, pp. 61. Iowa State College Press, Ames, Iowa. U.S.A. Hathi Trust.
  Reprinted 1949, Journal of General Microbiology 3, 444–462. 
 International Committee on Bacteriological Nomenclature. (1958, June). International code of nomenclature of bacteria and viruses. Ames, Iowa State College Press. BHL.
 Lapage, S.P., Sneath, P.H.A., Lessel, E.F., Skerman, V.B.D., Seeliger, H.P.R. & Clark, W.A. (1975). International Code of Nomenclature of Bacteria. 1975 Revision. American Society of Microbiology, Washington, D.C
 Lapage, S.P., Sneath, P.H.A., Lessel, E.F., Skerman, V.B.D., Seeliger, H.P.R. & Clark, W.A. (1992). International Code of Nomenclature of Bacteria. Bacteriological Code. 1990 Revision. American Society for Microbiology, Washington, D.C. link. 
 Parker, C.T., Tindall, B.J. & Garrity, G.M., eds. (2019). International Code of Nomenclature of Prokaryotes. Prokaryotic Code (2008 Revision). International Journal of Systematic and Evolutionary Microbiology 69(1A): S1–S111. doi: 10.1099/ijsem.0.000778

See also 
 Glossary of scientific naming
 International Committee on Taxonomy of Viruses
 Microbiology Society

References

External links 
 International Journal of Systematic and Evolutionary Microbiology Online
 
 List of Prokaryotic Names with Standing in Nomenclature
 Search of Prokaryotic Nomenclature provided by NamesforLife

International standards
Bacterial nomenclature
Nomenclature codes
International classification systems